Jason R. "Jay" Fraga (born 1972 in Massachusetts) is an American speaker, activist, and former BMX racer.

Jay is the founder and executive director of The Knockout Project. He is an outspoken advocate on the topic of concussion education, having sustained multiple concussions. He suffers from post-concussion syndrome.

Fraga argues that concussed athletes are unable to judge the severity of their own injuries and need oversight from medically-qualified sideline observers.

References

External links 
 The Knockout Project
 Jay Fraga Interview Part I, Triax Technologies
 Jay Fraga Interview Part II, Triax Technologies
 PBS "Jay Fraga Concussion Follow Up" extended interview
 BMX News "Riding Hurt With Robinson and Fraga" extended interview

American activists
Living people
1972 births
American people of Azorean descent
Concussion activists